Wilmer X is a Swedish rock band formed in Malmö in 1977. The group's classic line-up comprised Nisse Hellberg, Clas Rosenberg, Jalle Lorensson and Mats Thorin. Rooted in rock and punk, their sound incorporated elements of pop, country,  disco and blues.

History 

Wilmer X achieved their nationwide commercial breakthrough in 1988 with the LP Teknikens Under, the similarly entitled title track becoming a chart topper. As of date, Wilmer X has recorded more than eighteen studio albums during a career that spans thirty years.

In 1988 American artist Carla Olson, who is of Swedish heritage, recorded an album in Malmo, Sweden backed by members of Wilmer X. It is scheduled for re-release in early 2017 as Rubies & Diamonds on Sunset Blvd. Records with a few Sweden-related bonus tracks including Nisse Hellberg's song "Leka Med Live" (Playing With Life in English.) Swedish rocker Mikael Rickfors appears on two songs, his own composition "Touch" and Carla's "Kinderwars" which features Mick Taylor.

Personnel 

Current members
 Nisse Hellberg – vocals, guitars (1977–present)
 Jalle Lorensson – vocals, harmonica (1977–present)
 Sticky Bomb – drums, percussion, vocals (1982–present)
 Thomas Holst – vocals, bass, guitars (1983–1986, 1990–present)

Former members
 Mats Thorin – drums (1977–1978)
 Clas Rosenberg – guitars, vocals, bass (1977–1982)
 Jörgen Stridh – drums (1978–1980)
 Lennart Nygren – bass (1980–1982)
 Jalle Olsson – drums (1980–1982)
 Stefan Björk – vocals, bass (1983–1990)
 Pelle Ossler – vocals, guitars (1986–2003)
 Mats Bengtsson – vocals, bass, keyboards (1988–2003)

Nisse Hellberg
Nils "Nisse" Hellberg (born in Limhamn, Malmö on 2 April 1959) is a Swedish composer, lyricist, singer, musician, guitarist and frontman of the band Wilmer X and its co-founder with Jalle Lorensson. Besides his work with Wilmer X, he has released materials independent of the band.

In 1995, he was part of a fictitious 1960s rock band called The Lonely Boys where he assumed the name Richard Andersson and where he played lead guitar, harmonica, maracas, tambourine and vocals. He was joined by Per Gessle (known as Thomas Nyberg), Lasse Göransson (Thomas Holst), Roland Bergström (MP Persson) and Kalle Johansson (Micke Syd Andersson). The band and its songs were based on De ensamma pojkarna (Swedish for The Lonely Boys) by the Swedish author Mats Olsson about a young rhythm'n'pop band from the south of Sweden in 1965.

In collaboration with Peps Persson, he released the album Röster från södern (Voices from the South). In 2007 and 2008 he toured throughout Sweden with his solo material and in May 2008, was the solo opening act for John Fogerty. With Clas Rosenberg, he published the comics Swedish series Herman Frid in 1981. 

In 2014, he returned with a major solo album Vad har han i huvudet? released on Metronome label on 21 May 2014.

Discography

Albums

Other albums

Singles

References

External links 

 
 
Wilmer X Biography at Yahoo.com
Wilmer X Biography at last.fm

Swedish rock music groups